Biboohra is a rural town and locality in the Shire of Mareeba, Queensland, Australia. In the  the locality of Biboohra had a population of 568 people.

Geography 
The town is close to the southern boundary of the locality. The Mulligan Highway traverses the locality from the south to the west, passing the western edge of the town. The Tablelands railway line traverses the locality from the south to the east, passing the eastern edge of the town with the Biboohra railway station serving the town.

The Barron River flows through the locality from south to east passing to the immediate east of the town. The Bilwon State Forest is in the south-east of the locality. Most of the locality is used for farming with both grazing cattle and cropping, including mangoes, turf, and sugar cane.

History 
The town takes its name from its railway station, which in turn was named in 1884. It is believed that Biboohra is an Aboriginal name for the Barron Falls.

Biboohra Provisional School opened on 20 January 1902, becoming Biboohra State School on 1 January 1909.

In the  the locality of Biboohra had a population of 568 people.

Education 
Biboohra State School is a co-educational primary (P-6) school operated by the Queensland Government in Petersen Street. In 2016, the school had an enrolment of 91 students with 6 teachers (5 full-time equivalent) and 7 non-teaching staff (4 full-time equivalent).

Attractions 
Mud Park Australia is an obstacle course on land and on water to be tackled using amphibious all-terrain vehicles - This is now closed (2022).

References

External links 

Towns in Queensland
Shire of Mareeba
Localities in Queensland